East Atlanta Football Club is a soccer club from Atlanta, Georgia competing in the Deep South Division of USL League Two.

They were set to begin play in the 2020 USL League Two season, however, the season was canceled due to the COVID-19 pandemic.

Year-by-year

References

USL League Two teams
Association football clubs established in 2020
Soccer clubs in Georgia (U.S. state)
2020 establishments in Georgia (U.S. state)
Sports teams in Atlanta